This is a list of flags, banners and standards used in Tunisia.

National Flag

Government Flags

Ethnic Group Flags

Municipality Flags

Historical flags

Ancient Carthage

Roman rule

Early Islamic period

Almohad rule

Hafsid dynasty

Spanish Rule

Ottoman Rule

French Rule

Italian Rule

Kingdom of Tunisia

See also 

 Flag of Tunisia
 Coat of arms of Tunisia

References 

Lists and galleries of flags
Flags